Dark Light Daybreak is the third studio album by Athens-based band, Now It's Overhead. It was released on September 12, 2006.

Track listing
"Let the Sirens Rest" – 4:09
"Estranged" – 4:01
"Walls" – 3:43
"Believe What They Decide" – 3:39
"Night Vision" – 3:51
"Type A" – 2:25
"Dark Light Daybreak" – 3:53
"Meaning to Say" – 4:01
"Let Up" – 3:26
"Nothing in Our Way" – 4:10

References

2006 albums
Now It's Overhead albums
Saddle Creek Records albums
Albums produced by Andy LeMaster